Nizhneye Soskovo is a rural locality in Kosteltsevsky Selsoviet Rural Settlement, Kurchatovsky District, Kursk Oblast, Russia. Population:

Geography 
The village is located on the Lomna River (a right tributary of the Seym), 71.5 km from the Russia–Ukraine border, 33 km west of Kursk, 12 km north-east of the district center – the town Kurchatov, 13 km from the selsoviet center – Kosteltsevo.

 Climate
Nizhneye Soskovo has a warm-summer humid continental climate (Dfb in the Köppen climate classification).

Transport 

The rural locality is situated 39 km from Kursk Vostochny Airport, 137 km from Belgorod International Airport and 242 km from Voronezh Peter the Great Airport.

References

Notes

Sources

Rural localities in Kurchatovsky District, Kursk Oblast